Molinari is an Italian producer of leather sofas, armchairs, stools, and desks. Molinari regularly exhibits at the furniture fair Salone Internazionale del Mobile in Milan, Italy.

References

Furniture companies of Italy
Italian brands